The 1986 Indiana Hoosiers football team represented Indiana University Bloomington as a member of the Big Ten Conference during the 1986 NCAA Division I-A football season. Led by third-year head coach Bill Mallory, the Hoosiers compiled an overall record of 6–6 with a mark of 3–5 in conference play, tying for sixth place in the Big Ten. Indian was invited to the  All-American Bowl, where they lost to Florida State. The team played home games at Memorial Stadium in Bloomington, Indiana.

Schedule

Personnel

Season summary

Ohio State

Michigan

at Purdue

vs. Florida State (All-American Bowl)

1987 NFL draftees

References

Indiana
Indiana Hoosiers football seasons
Indiana Hoosiers football